Grablje may refer to:
Grablje, Busovača, a village in the Central Bosnia Canton, Bosnia and Herzegovina
Grablje, Ljubinje, a village in the municipality of Ljubinje, Bosnia and Herzegovina